Richard Fuller (born July 14, 1947) is an American classical pianist and interpreter of the fortepiano repertoire.

Early life and musical education

Born in Washington, Fuller initially studied piano with his mother, Georgette Fuller. After studying piano and musicology at Central Washington University, he went on to receive a master's degree in music from the University of Oregon in 1971. Subsequently, he studied harpsichord and fortepiano in San Francisco, New York and Vienna.

Life and career

Since relocating to Vienna, Austria, over three decades ago, Fuller has emerged as an interpreter of the fortepiano repertoire. He has performed in Vienna's Konzerthaus, Gesellschaft der Musikfreunde in Vienna, Amsterdam's Concertgebouw, London's Wigmore Hall and many other major venues and festivals in Europe, the United States, Japan  and Central America. Fuller is one of the few who has sought to address himself exclusively to the interpretive potential of the fortepiano, its subtle sensitivity and delicacy evoking an earlier - in many respects lost - keyboard culture.

Born in the U.S. state of Washington, Fuller studied initially with his mother, later taking degrees in piano and musicology at Central Washington University and the University of Oregon, He studied harpsichord and fortepiano in San Francisco and Vienna. The emphasis of his artistic work lies in the interpretation of the piano, chamber music and the Lied repertoire of the Viennese Classical and early Romantic periods, performed on the fortepiano. His concert work has led him to the musical centers of North America and Europe where he appears as soloist, accompanist and member of numerous chamber music ensembles devoted primarily to the performance of 18th-century music on authentic instruments. In addition he has collaborated with artists James Levine (with the Vienna Philharmonic), Emma Kirkby, Maria Kubizek, Andrew Manze, Klaus Mertens,], Dorothea Röschman, Claus Ocker, Wolfgang Holzmair, the Festetics String Quartet (Budapest), Vienna Academy Orchestra, Musica Aeterna Bratislava, and Capella Musicae Graz; live concerts in radio and television, film music, broadcast productions for German Radio (Deutschlandfunk, Cologne), North German Radio (Norddeutscher Rundfunk, Hamburg), Austrian National Radio, BBC and the Hungarian National Radio as well as numerous CD recordings in Germany, Austria, Switzerland and Slovakia. Fuller's discography also includes noted premiere recordings of the piano quartets of Johann Baptist Wanhal with Musica Aeterna Bratislava, the solo piano works of Ignaz Pleyel (1757–1831) and the cycle of 12 piano sonatas of Hyacinthe Jadin (1776–1800).

In 2002, Fuller received from the University of Oregon Distinguished Alumnus Award for his artistic work. In 2006 Fuller initiated and directed the Donaustädter Mozart Projekt, an ongoing series of performances dedicated to the piano music, chamber music and vocal music of Mozart's Vienna years (1781–1791). Other recent projects include recordings of Haydn's piano music on one of Haydn's few known pianos as well as a comprehensive project in 2008 and 2009 in connection with the Haydn Year 2009 of his piano music, vocal music and chamber music.

Discography

Bach, J. S.

Sonata in G minor for Harpsichord and Flute (D. Johansen) Spectrum
Studios, Portland, Oregon

Bach, J. C

Sonata in C major, Op. 18, Nr. l (D. Johansen), Spectrum/Portland, Oregon
Sonata in C major, Op. 18, Nr. l (T. Pietch) NDR, Hamburg
Sonata in G major, (T. Pietsch) NDR, Hamburg

Bach, C.P.E.

Double Concerto in E♭ major for Harpsichord and Fortepiano Wq.47 (Haselboeck, Wiener Akademie) Novalis 150 025-2
Solo Clavierwerke (Wq. 59, 67) BBC, London
5A Sammlung fuer Kenner and Liebhaber Wq. 59; Palatine 9-0202
Sonata in E minor Wq. 59/i
Rondo in G major Wq. 59/ii
Sonata in B♭ major Wq. 59/iii
Rondo in C minor Wq. 59/iv
Fantasy in F major Wq. 59/v
Fantasy in C major Wq. 59/vi

Beethoven, L. van

Sonata in F major for Piano and Naturhorn, Op. 17; (J. Schroeder) Ambitus 97981
Serenade in D for piano and flute Op. 41 (D. Johansen); Spectrum/Portland, Oregon
Rondo in C Major for piano op. 51 Nr. 1; MA 10 98 839
Scottish Songs op. l08: (Mertens, Sepie, terLinden) MA 98 10 839
Bonny laddie, highland laddie
Sympathy
Oh sweet were the hours
Faithfu' Johnnie
Could this ill world have been contriv'd
The Shepherd's Song
Oh, had my fate been join'd with thine
Sunset
Sally in our alley
The lovely lass of Inverness
Polly Stewart
O Mary, at thy Window be
The Maid of lsla
Enchantress, fare well
Trio in B♭ major for piano, violin and cello WwO 39; (Sepie, terLinden) MA 98 10 839

Danzi, Franz

Sonata in E♭ major for Piano and Naturhorn, Op. 28; (J. Schroeder) Ambitus 97 981
DeKrufFt, Mcholas
Sonata in F major for Piano and Naturhorn; (J. Schroeder) Ambitus 97 981
Three Preludes and Fugues, WDR, Cologne, BRD

Dussek, J. L.

Sonata in D major, Op. 31 Nr. 2; MD+G 1252, Detmold, BRD
The Sufferings of the Queen of France', WDR, Cologne, BRD
Rondo: My Lodging is in the Cold, ColdGround; MD+G 1252, Detmold, BRD
Trio in C minor for Piano, Violin and Cello, Op. 31, Nr 7; WDR, Cologne, BRD
Trio in B♭ major for Piano, Violin and Cello, Op. 21, Nr J; WDR, Cologne, BRD
Variations for Piano "O ma tendre Mussette", Op. 6; MD+G 1252, Detmold, BRD

Haydn, J.

Capriccio in G major, Hob. XVÜ/1;M D+G 1252, Detmold, BRD
Trio in A major for Piano, Violin and Cello Hob. XV/18; Canterino 1021 (Manze, terLinden)
Trio in G major for Piano, Violin and Cello Hob XV/25 (Die tastrumentisten Wien)
Sonata in A major, Hob. XVI/28; MD+G 1252, Detmold, BRD
Variations on "Gott erhalte" Hob. 111/77; MD+G 1252, Detmold, BRD
Scottish Songs (Voice, piano, violin and cello); Canterino 1021 (Mertens, Manze, terLinden)
Argyle is my Name Hob XXXi/al71
Argyle is my Name (instrumental)
The Blue Bell of Scotland Hob.XXXI/al76
The Blue Bell of Scotland (instrumental)
Braw Laos of Gallawater Hob. XXXI/a207
Fife and all the Lands about it Hob. XXXI/a29
Haw can I be sad on my wedding day Hob. XXXI/a36
Killicrankie Hob. XXXI/al69
Killicrankie (instrumental)
Maggie Lauder Uob. XXXI/a35
Maggie Lander (instrumental)
My Love she 's but a Lassie yet Hob. XXXI/al94
My Love she 's but a Lassie yet (instrumental)
Peggy in Devotion Hob.XXXI/a96
The Ploughman Hob. XXXI/alO
Saw ye my father Hob. XXXI/a5
Saw ye my father (instrumental)
Will ye go to Flanders Hob. XXXI/b47
Argyle is my Name (instrumental); (T. Pietsch) NDR, Hamburg, BRD
The Blue Bell of Scotland (instrumental); (T. Pietsch) NDR, Hamburg, BRD
Killicrankie (instrumental); (T. Pietsch) NDR, Hamburg, BRD
Maggie Lauder (instrumental); (T. Pietsch) NDR, Hamburg, BRD
My Love she 's but a Lassie yet (instrumental); (T. Pietsch) NDR, Hamburg, BRD
Saw ye my father (instrumental);^. Pietsch) NDR, Hamburg, BRD

Kuhlau, Friedrich

Andante and Polacca in F for Piano and Naturhorn; (J.Schroeder); Ambitus 97 981

Moscheies, Ignaz

Introduction and Rondo, Op. 63 for Piano and Naturhorn; (J. Schroeder) Ambitus 97 981

Mozart, W.A.

Adagio in B minor KV 540; Palatino 9-0102
Early Symphonies KV 43, 45, 48, 73, 74,84; (Vienna Philharmonie, James Levine, cond.) Deutsche Grammophon 431711-2
Fantasy in D minor KV 397; Palatine 9-0101
Fantasy in C minor KV 475; Palatine 9-0102
Quartet in G minor KV 478 for Piano and Strings; (Kertesz, Szüts, Peters) Novalis 150072-2
Rondo in D major KV 485; Palatine 9-0102
Rondo in A minor KV 511; Palatine 9-0103
Sonata in E♭ major KV 282; Palatine 9-0101
Sonata in G major KV 283; Palatine 9-0101
Sonata in D major KV 311; Palatine 9-0103
Sonata in C major KV 330; Palatine 9-0101
Sonata in A major KV 331; Palatine 9-0103
Sonata in F major KV 332; Palatine 9-0102
Sonata in B♭ major KV 333; Palatine 9-0103
Sonata in C major KV 545; Palatine 9-0101
Sonata in Bb major KV 570; Palatine 9-0102
Sonata for Clavier and Violin in G major KV 301; (T. Pietsch) Ambitus 97816; also for NDR, Hamburg, BRD
Sonata for Clavier and Violin in E♭ major KV 302; (T. Pietsch) Ambitus 97816; also for NDR, Hamburg, BRD
Sonata for Clavier and Violin in C major KV 303; (T. Pietsch) Ambitus 97816
Sonata for Clavier and Violin in E minor KV 304; (T. Pietsch) Ambitus 97816

Schubert, F.

Deutsche Tänze D 783; Preiser 90177
Deutsche Tänze D 790; Preiser 90177
Song Cycle: Die schöne Müllerin D795; (Claus Ocker) Ambitus 97 852
Song Cycle: Die Winterreise D911; (Claus Ocker) Ambitus 97 863

Awards

 University of Oregon School of Music's Distinguished Alumnus, 2002
 Wien-Donaustadt Artist of the Year, 2005

References

External links
 http://www.RichardFullerFortepiano.at

1947 births
20th-century American male musicians
20th-century American pianists
20th-century classical pianists
21st-century American male musicians
21st-century American pianists
21st-century classical pianists
American classical pianists
American harpsichordists
American male classical pianists
American performers of early music
Fortepianists
Living people